Macrometopia is a South American genus of hoverfly, restricted to the high Andes.

Species
M. atra Philippi, 1865
M. montensis (Hull, 1938)
M. maculipennis Thompson, 1999

References

Hoverfly genera
Diptera of South America
Taxa named by Rodolfo Amando Philippi
Eristalinae